Sasural is a 1984 Hindi movie produced by Biswanath Prasad Shahabadi and directed by Govind Moonis. The film stars Arun Govil, Bharat Bhushan, Arvind Deshpande, Gulshan Grover, Sadhana Singh  and Dina Pathak.

Plot
Chanda (Sadhana Singh) had never known her parents. She had never experienced a mother's love and care, nor the joys of a happy family. She is treated badly by her Aunt who took her in when she was orphaned. Chanda experiences sympathy, love and a sense of belonging for the first time when she meets Narendra (Arun Govil). They marry and Chanda finally gets the love and affection of a family. However, her Aunt Jagdamba is not happy with the marriage as she wanted her daughter, Deepa (Sukhjeet Kaur) to marry Narendra. She tells and blackmails Chanda, that her mother died of Leprosy and so she must be a carrier of the disease too.

Cast
 Arun Govil - Narendra Sharma
Sadhana Singh - Chanda
Sukhjeet Kaur - Deepa
Bharat Bhushan - Ram Sahay
Shammi - Jagdamba
Dina Pathak - Narendra's mother
Arvind Deshpande - Advocate Shivshankar Sharma
Gulshan Grover - Bansi
Manjushree - Nirmala
Mushtaq Khan - Pratap
Paidi Jairaj - Doctor
Manmauji - Bhola (as Manmaujee)
Lalita Kumari

Songs
All Lyrics were written by Ravindra Jain who was also the Music Director for the film.

1. "Sun Sun Gaon Ki Gori" - Yesudas

2. "Chahe Koi Hath Jode" - Aarti Mukherjee, Hemalata

3. "Aaj Main Bahut Khush Hu" - Kishore Kumar, Sadhana Singh

4. "Na Jane Kab Kaise" - Kishore Kumar, Hemalata

5. "Bhabhi O Bhabhi" - Aarti Mukherjee, Dilraj Kaur

6. "Yadukul Raghav" - Hemalata

References

External links 
 

1984 films
1980s Hindi-language films